In enzymology, a pimeloyl-CoA dehydrogenase is an enzyme that catalyzes the chemical reaction

pimeloyl-CoA + NAD+  6-carboxyhex-2-enoyl-CoA + NADH + H+

Thus, the two substrates of this enzyme are pimeloyl-CoA and NAD+, whereas its 3 products are 6-carboxyhex-2-enoyl-CoA, NADH, and H+.

This enzyme belongs to the family of oxidoreductases, specifically those acting on the CH-CH group of donor with NAD+ or NADP+ as acceptor.  The systematic name of this enzyme class is pimeloyl-CoA:NAD+ oxidoreductase. This enzyme participates in benzoate degradation via coa ligation.

References

 

EC 1.3.1
NADH-dependent enzymes
Enzymes of unknown structure